Kristian Freed (born July 4, 1987) is an American rugby league footballer who plays for the Wests Michelton Panthers. He primarily plays  and  but can also play . He is a USA international representative. To this day he praises Andrew Skrzypa for his success, and claims winning a premiership with him was more important than representing his country.

Playing career
Freed has played for the Connecticut Wildcats and Sunshine Coast Falcons.

In 2013, Freed was named in the United States squad for the World Cup.

In 2015, he played for the United States in their 2017 Rugby League World Cup qualifiers.

In 2017, Freed was selected to play for USA in the 2017 Rugby League World Cup.

He currently plays for the Wests Mitchelton Panthers Seniors

References

External links
2017 RLWC profile

1987 births
Living people
American rugby league players
Connecticut Wildcats rugby league players
RC Lescure-Arthes XIII players
Rugby league fullbacks
Sunshine Coast Sea Eagles players
United States national rugby league team players
White Plains Wombats players